"Do Your Thing" is a song by English electronic music duo Basement Jaxx. It originally appeared on their second studio album, Rooty (2001), and was released as a CD single in Australia in 2003, reaching number 33 on the ARIA Singles Chart. In the UK, it was released in September 2005 by record label XL, when it reached number 32 on the UK Singles Chart. The lead vocals are sung by Elliot May.

Composition and video
The song samples the track "Fungii Mama" from Kenny Barron's album Lemuria-Seascape (1991). The song's music video was directed by Kim Gehrig, in her directorial debut, and features people in a park wearing t-shirts which mirror the song lyrics.

Critical reception
The song is included on the 2011 experimental live album Basement Jaxx vs. Metropole Orkest. Reviewing the album for The Independent, Andy Gill said: "'Do Your Thing' is very New York in flavour, a big-band jazz groove led by piano, the audience clapping along with the rattling percussion as brash trombones and sinuous saxophone take brief solos before the strings whip the piece to its conclusion."

Charts

Certifications

Release history

References

2001 songs
2003 singles
2005 singles
Basement Jaxx songs
Songs written by Felix Buxton
Songs written by Simon Ratcliffe (musician)
XL Recordings singles